The Real Estate and Business Brokers Acts is the legislation regulating the individual brokers and businesses registered to trade in real estate in Ontario, Canada. The most recent version, the Real Estate and Business Brokers Acts, 2002, came into force in Ontario, Canada on March 31, 2006. Sections 50 to 53, dealing with the creation of regulations, were enabled on November 7, 2005. Section 8, dealing with specialist certifications, has yet to be proclaimed. REBBA is administered by the Real Estate Council of Ontario on behalf of the Ontario Ministry of Consumer Services.

The Real Estate and Business Brokers Act, 2002, replaces the Real Estate and Business Brokers Act, 1990.  Notable changes with the new legislation include:
 modernized framework for registering and regulating brokerages, brokers and salespersons
 rules of trading moved from previous Act to new Act's Regulations
 procedures and programs previously found in RECO by-laws, e.g., insurance, continuing education, code of ethics and complaints process
 increased maximum fines for violations of the Act

The first Real Estate Brokers Act was passed in Ontario in 1930.

See also
 Mortgage Brokerages, Lenders and Administrators Act

References

External links
 
 RECO Guide to REBBA 2002

Real estate in Canada
Ontario provincial legislation
2002 in Canadian law
2002 in Ontario
Housing legislation in Canada